A declaration of war by Canada is a formal declaration issued by the Government of Canada (the federal Crown-in-Council) indicating that a state of war exists between Canada and another nation. It is an exercise of the royal prerogative on the constitutional advice of the ministers of the Crown in Cabinet and does not require the direct approval of the Parliament of Canada, though such can be sought by the government. Since gaining the authority to declare war as a consequence of the Statute of Westminster, 1931, Canada has done so only during the Second World War.

Second World War

Nazi Germany

After Nazi Germany invaded Poland on September 1, 1939, the United Kingdom and France declared war on September 3. To assert Canada's independence from the UK, as already established by the Statute of Westminster, 1931, the Cabinet decided to seek the approval of the federal Parliament to declare war. Parliament was not scheduled to return until October 2, but was summoned by the Governor General early on September 7 to consider the declaration of war.

The House of Commons and Senate approved authorization for a declaration of war on 9 September. The Cabinet then drafted an order-in-council to that effect. The following day, Vincent Massey, Canada's High Commissioner to the United Kingdom, brought the document to George VI, king of Canada, at the Royal Lodge, Windsor Great Park, for his signature, whereupon Canada had officially declared war on Germany. In his capacity as the government's official recorder for the war effort, Leonard Brockington noted: " did not ask us to declare war for him—we asked King George VI of Canada to declare war for us."

Fascist Italy
On June 10, 1940, Italy declared war on France and the United Kingdom and its allies. Though the Canadian Minister of National Defence, Norman Rogers, had been killed in a plane crash that day, Prime Minister Mackenzie King still tabled a motion in the House of Commons, stating in it:

Mackenzie King went on to explain that, after passage of the motion through Parliament, it would be presented, via Cabinet, to the King for his approval and a royal proclamation would be produced, declaring "the existence of a state of war between Canada and Italy." Both houses of Parliament gave their consent to a declaration of war and the Cabinet proceeded with the aforementioned steps the same day. The proclamation, as printed in the Canada Gazette, was read by the Prime Minister to Parliament on June 11 1940.

Japan, Finland, Hungary, and Romania
Parliament adjourned on November 14, 1941, and was not scheduled to return until January 21, 1942. However, at the urging of the Soviet Union, the United Kingdom declared war on Finland on December 6, 1941. At the UK's urging, the Canadian Cabinet the next day issued a royal proclamation declaring war on Finland, Hungary, and Romania, three countries that had recently allied themselves with Nazi Germany.

Coincidentally, also on December 7, 1941 (December 8 in Japan), the Empire of Japan began an undeclared war upon the United Kingdom—invading Hong Kong and Malaya—as well as Canada and the United States—attacking Pearl Harbor . Mackenzie King and the rest of Cabinet decided to go to war with Japan that evening and issued a royal proclamation the following day declaring that, as of December 7, a state of war existed between Japan and Canada. One day later, the US and UK also declared war on the Japanese Empire.

These proclamations were presented by Mackenzie King to the House of Commons when parliament returned on its scheduled date. Therein, the Prime Minister tabled motions for parliamentary approval of the declarations of war, though, permission from the legislators was not needed.

Still, Parliament having not been sitting when war was declared on Japan, Romania, Finland, and Hungary was concerning to Mackenzie King. According to his diary, though, he told himself that the declarations of war were "all part of the same war," meaning the war that had begun for Canada on September 10, 1939. The Prime Minister had thus decided Parliament did not need to be reconvened earlier than scheduled to approve these later declarations of war.

Since the Second World War

While Canada has participated in a number of conflicts since the Second World War, the country has not declared war in any of them. Even before that war officially ended for Canada by royal proclamation in 1951, Canada entered the Korean War on August 15, 1950, after the United Nations Security Council passed a resolution requesting assistance from member-states of the United Nations in dealing with North Korean aggression. Cabinet, then headed by Prime Minister Louis St Laurent, stated to the House of Commons that Canada would not declare war on North Korea, but would send military forces to participate in a collective police action, "under the control of the United Nations for the purpose of restoring peace to an area where an aggression has occurred," in keeping with the Charter of the United Nations, which Canada signed in 1948. While that charter does not prevent one country from declaring war on another, it sets up a collective wherein members of the United Nations can join together to thwart aggression by a country and "restore peace without having to go through the formality of declaring war."

Canada has since repeatedly supported the UN and cooperative action in ensuring international peace. As such. the National Defence Act was amended in 1950, by the Canadian Forces Act, to allow for the Crown-in-Council to put the Canadian Armed Forces into active service both when the country's security is threatened and when the country engages in collective action under the UN Charter, the North Atlantic Treaty, or other international defence arrangements. The act also requires the governor general to recall parliament within 10 days of the government putting the military into active service.

After the Canadian Forces Act received royal assent on September 9, 1950, the Governor General-in-Council issued Order-in-Council PC 1950-4365, assigning a number of Canadian Armed Forces members to the Korean War and placing all Canadian military personnel on active service. As a result of that order, and subsequent amendments, the Canadian Armed Forces have effectively been on active duty since 1950.

See also
Military history of Canada
List of conflicts in Canada
Military history of Canada during World War II
Declarations of war by Great Britain and the United Kingdom
Declaration of war by the United States

References

Canada
Wars involving Canada
Military history of Canada